Damir Ravilevich Zhafyarov (born 17 March 1994) is a Russian professional ice hockey player for SKA Saint Petersburg of the Kontinental Hockey League (KHL).

Playing career
Undrafted, Zhafyarov made his Kontinental Hockey League (KHL) debut playing with Metallurg Novokuznetsk during the 2012–13 KHL season.

Following parts of two seasons with Admiral Vladivostok, Zhafyarov left as a free agent in signing a one-year contract with Torpedo Nizhny Novgorod on May 25, 2018.

Zharyarov developed into an integral part of the offense, during his four season tenure with Torpedo, and produced 173 points through 219 games. As a free agent following the 2021–22 season, Zhafyarov left the club to sign a lucrative two-year contract with SKA Saint Petersburg on 27 May 2022.

Career statistics

Regular season and playoffs

International

References

External links
 

1994 births
Living people
Admiral Vladivostok players
HC CSKA Moscow players
Krasnaya Armiya (MHL) players
Kuznetskie Medvedi players
Metallurg Novokuznetsk players
Ice hockey people from Moscow
Russian ice hockey left wingers
HC Sibir Novosibirsk players
SKA Saint Petersburg players
Torpedo Nizhny Novgorod players